Venla is a Finnish feminine given name. Venla was the fourth most popular name for baby girls born in Finland in 2007.

Notable bearers
Venla, the main female character from the Aleksis Kivi penned Finnish novel Seven Brothers
Venla Hovi (born 1987), Finnish ice hockey player
Venla Lehtonen (born 1995), Finnish biathlete
Venla Niemi (born 1990), Finnish orienteering competitor

References

Finnish feminine given names